Thirteenth Lake is located southwest of Christian Hill, New York. Fish species present in the lake are brook trout, rainbow trout, brown trout, atlantic salmon, tiger trout, white sucker, and black bullhead. Access by carry down on the northeast shore. No motors are allowed on this lake.

References

Lakes of New York (state)
Lakes of Warren County, New York